Management is the directing of a group of people or entities toward a goal.

Management may also refer to:

Management (film), a 2009 romantic comedy-drama film
Management (game), a 1960 business simulation board game
Management (magazine), a French magazine
 MGMT (originally "The Management"), an American musical group consisting of Ben Goldwasser and Andrew VanWyngarden

Types of management: Business
 Benefits realisation management
 Brand management
 Business process management
 Change management
 Customer relationship management
 Diversity management
 Digital asset management
 Information management
 Knowledge management
 Project management
 Quality management
 Records management
 Resource management
 Risk management
 Strategic management
 Time management
 Turnaround management

Types of management: Computing
 Content management
 Computer file management
 Data management
 Database management system
 Digital rights management
 Document Management
 Identity management
 Information technology management
 Memory management
 Network management
 Systems management

Types of management: Medicine
 Medical case management, a collaborative process facilitating appropriate medical care
 Pain management, an intervention that is intended to relieve rather than cure
 Palliative care, used to manage the process of death
 Watchful waiting used to manage the risk that a disease or condition may worsen, rather than taking action
 Therapy is a method to treat a disease or condition
 Lifestyle management programmes are methods to promote health and avoid preventable disease
 Dieting is way to  manage weight
 Disease management (health)

See also
 
 
 Manager (disambiguation)